Lavalle Department  is a  department of Corrientes Province in Argentina.

Settlements
Cruz de los Milagros
Gobernador Juan E. Martínez
Lavalle
Santa Lucía
Yataytí Calle

Departments of Corrientes Province